Nullo may refer to:

Francesco Nullo, 19th-century Italian partisan and merchant

Other
Null-O
A slang term for body modification, specifically total genital nullification. See Nullo (body modification).
A bid in card games where one attempts to take no tricks, such as Misère

Surnames of Italian origin